Jagged is the fifteenth solo studio album by English musician Gary Numan, his first original album in over five years, following Pure in 2000. Stylistically Jagged was a development of its predecessor's chorus-driven, anthemic industrial sound, utilising heavier electronics and more prominent live drumming. Although reaction to the new record was predominantly positive, critical opinion was more heavily divided than had been the case with the almost universal praise enjoyed by Pure. Reaching number 59 in the UK album charts, Jagged charted no higher than the earlier release, some commentators and fans regarding the long time between albums as a missed opportunity for consolidation in the wake of Pure'''s reception and the number 13 UK chart position attained by Numan's 2003 single with Rico, "Crazier". Jagged was the first album issued on Numan's own Mortal Records label, licensed to Cooking Vinyl. The US release, on Metropolis Records, included an alternate mix of "Fold" as a bonus track. In April Numan embarked on a tour of the UK, Europe and North America to promote the album.

Production
Originally planned for a 2003 release, Jagged was finally issued in March 2006 after various delays that had resulted in adverse comments from a number of fans, to which Numan responded in kind on his website, NuWorld. He cited the birth of his two children after years of unsuccessful IVF attempts, issues with his former record company Artful, and trepidation at the prospect of producing a successful follow-up to the critically praised Pure as reasons for the delay. Given the album's long gestation period, by the time it was released a number of the tracks had already been published in one form or another. "Haunted" began life as an instrumental on the 2002 compilation Exposure. "Halo" had been premiered in concert in 2003 as "Does God Bleed?", before being given a live DVD release in 2005, as had the title track.

Numan used more musicians on Jagged than on any of his releases for the past decade. The Sulpher team of Rob Holiday and Monti contributed to a number of tracks but, in the end, Numan took the finishing production touches out of their hands and completed the album with techno musician and DJ Ade Fenton. Guest performers included former Nine Inch Nails drummer Jerome Dillon, as well as Martin McCarrick from Therapy?, Siouxsie and the Banshees and other bands, and his wife Kimberlee. Long-time Numan collaborators Steve Harris, Richard Beasley and Andy Gray also played on the album.

The album sold far less than Pure and Exile, his last two albums released through Eagle Records.  However Numan claimed this was down to the increasing number of illegal downloads, and stated Jagged on one site had 20,000 downloads of the album alone.  The preceding US tour also saw lower numbers due to bad promotion of the album in the states.

Style
The opening song, "Pressure", featured Middle Eastern sounds coupled with lyrics that obliquely alluded to the impatience of fans for new product. Numan's vocal delivery on "Halo" recalled the dance-orientated style of his late-1980s work. "Haunted" utilised a guitar riff reminiscent of Led Zeppelin's "Kashmir". "In a Dark Place", released as a single and video in July 2006, was one of a number of tracks which continued the (literal) questioning of God common to Numan's three previous albums, Sacrifice (1994), Exile (1997) and Pure. Another track debunking religious beliefs was "Melt", with the lines "I know that Heaven is a burnt out shell / I know forgiveness is the door to Hell / I know confession is a black empty lie".

A number of reviewers noted ephemeral links between Jagged and Numan's classic work from the late 1970s and early 1980s, though the composer himself claimed not to see such connections. The final/title track, as well as featuring harshly whispered vocals in the style of Numan's 2002 hit "Rip", included in its coda an echo of the distinctive siren-like 'vox humana' Polymoog sound that characterised "Cars" and other songs on The Pleasure Principle (1979), and also appeared on the Andy Gray remix Pure'''s "A Prayer for the Unborn".

Track listing
All songs written by Gary Numan.

 "Pressure" – 5:19
 "Fold" – 5:47
 "Halo" – 4:17
 "Slave" – 6:02
 "In a Dark Place" – 6:06
 "Haunted" – 5:31
 "Blind" – 7:01
 "Before You Hate It" – 5:14
 "Melt" – 5:18
 "Scanner" – 6:02
 "Jagged" – 5:27

Personnel

Performance
 Richard Beasley – drums
 Jerome Dillon – drums
 Ade Fenton – keyboards, drum and sound programming
 Andy Gray – keyboards, programming
 Steve Harris – guitars
 Rob Holiday – guitar, bass
 Kimberlee McCarrick – violin
 Martin McCarrick – cello
 Monti – drums, keyboards, programming
 Gary Numan – Vocals, guitar, keyboards
 Gordon Young – keyboards, programming, instrumentation

Production
 Steve Gullick – photography
 Gary Numan – producer, engineer, mixing engineer
 Ade Fenton – producer
 James O'Connell – engineer
 Nick Watson – mastering

Notes

External links 
 Album microsite
 NuWorld

Gary Numan albums
Dark wave albums
2006 albums
Cooking Vinyl albums